The 2000 European Men's Handball Championship was the fourth edition of the tournament and was held in Croatia from 21 to 30 January 2000, in the cities of Zagreb and Rijeka. Sweden won the tournament after defeating Russia in the final, while Spain finished third.

Qualification 

Note: Bold indicates champion for that year. Italic indicates host for that year.

Venues 
Two Croatian cities were selected as hosts for the 2000 Championship:

Preliminary round 
All times are local (UTC+1).

Group A

Group B

Placement matches

Eleventh place game

Ninth place game

Seventh place game

Fifth place game

Knockout stage

Bracket

Semifinals

Third place game

Final

Ranking and statistics

Final ranking

All-Star Team 

Source: EHF

Top goalscorers 

Source: EHF

Top goalkeepers 
(minimum 20% of total shots received by team)

Source: EHF

References

External links 
 Results

European Men's Handball Championship
E
H
International handball competitions hosted by Croatia
European Men's Handball Championship
Sport in Rijeka
European Men's Handball Championship, 2000
European Men's Handball Championship, 2000